Hapalomantis is a genus of mantises belonging to the family Nanomantidae.

Species:

Hapalomantis abyssinica 
Hapalomantis congica 
Hapalomantis katangica 
Hapalomantis lacualis 
Hapalomantis minima 
Hapalomantis orba 
Hapalomantis rhombochir

References

Mantodea genera